Githeri (Gĩtheri), also called muthere or mutheri is a Kenyan traditional meal of maize and legumes, mostly beans of any type, mixed and boiled together. The maize and beans are mixed in a sufuria, a type of pot. Water is then added, and the mixture is boiled until the food is cooked and ready to eat. Githeri is the staple food of the Gikuyu, Meru, Mbeere people and Embu people in the Central Province and Eastern Province  of Kenya. It is also popular in other parts of the country, such as with the Kamba people of Eastern province of Kenya. The beans and maize can either be fresh or dry, but most people prefer the flavor of fresh beans and corn which are also softer. The primary ingredients for this dish, maize and beans, are easily accessible directly from local farms and homesteads.

Githeri can also be made into a stew with the addition of vegetables, potatoes, and sometimes meat. It can be used to make mukimo by adding potatoes, bananas, and greens and mashing up the mixture. Lately, there has been a rise in the popularity of Githeri due to the health benefits associated with this plant-based dish.

The dish is widespread and is also a traditional dish from North Africa to South Africa. The base of Githeri ingredients is used in other meals from different regions. The maize, beans, other available legumes, and even ground nuts are known by other names, such as Kande, Pure, and Ngate in Tanzania.   

This popular dish has been the main meal served to students since the 1920s. Eating githeri is now a trend for young people, and it is even served in many hotels in Kenya.

Terms associated with Githeri

Kikuyu language
 murugarugio – githeri put in a plate direct from the pot, with only salt added to it. murugarugio comes from the Kikuyu meaning moving up and down. Once the salt is added the plate is shaken up and down.
 gikangu (pronounced gy-kah-ngoh) – cold githeri with more maize than beans. Traditionally was cooked in poor households and served to school-aged children.
 kagoto – ballast in English; this is a slang name for githeri used by secondary school students in Central Province.
 mbeu – seeds; the githeri is described as seeds because it contains whole maize and beans.
 mukimo – githeri mixed with potatoes, greens and bananas, then mashed together.
 mutheri – another name for githeri.
 muthungu – githeri made out of maize exclusively without beans. Muthungu means "the white man" which is a fitting name for a dish full of white seeds.
 kibecu – slang for githeri amongst young Kikuyus.

Mbeere language
 mbeu – seeds; the githeri is described as seeds because it contains whole maize and beans.
 mukimo – githeri mixed with potatoes, greens and bananas, then mashed together.
 muthokoi – githeri with corn whose testa (seedcoat) has been partially removed.

Kamba language
 isyo – general name for githeri.
 mukeu – githeri made of undried (fresh) corn and legumes(beans).
 muthakyo – githeri which has only been boiled and is served without any soup in it.
 muthokoi – githeri with corn whose testa (seedcoat) has been partially removed.

Luo Language
 nyoyo – general name for githeri in Luo.
 mahanya – shelled maize boiled and eaten without beans

Kalenjin languages
 kwankwaniek – general name for githeri; loosely "cooked,cooked food", from kwany (cook)

IsiZulu language
 Izinkobe - the general name for getheri in isiZulu. The maize can either be fresh or dry. When using dry maize, beans are added mid-cooking when the maize has softened.

Slang
 murrum murro – Swahili slang (Sheng) for githeri due to its similar appearance to murram roads; popular among high school students.

See also
 Succotash
 Ugali
 Chapati

References

External links
Rainy season, it's Githeri time.

Kenyan cuisine
Maize dishes